Thad Cochran (1937–2019) was a U.S. Senator for Mississippi from 1978 to 2018. Senator Cochran may also refer to:

Charles F. Cochran (1846–1906), Missouri State Senate
James Cochran (New York politician) (1769–1848), New York State Senate
James Cochran (North Carolina politician) (1760s–1813), North Carolina State Senate